Adam Herzog-Weber (12 May 1829 – 2 August 1895) was a Swiss politician and President of the Swiss Council of States (1887).

External links 
 
 

1829 births
1895 deaths
Members of the Council of States (Switzerland)
Presidents of the Council of States (Switzerland)